Moore Hall is a country house located in the village of Moore, Cheshire, England.  It was built in the early 18th century, and is constructed in roughcast brick with a slate roof.  The house has three storeys, and is in five bays.  The porch is a more modern, and is fronted by a Venetian window.  The windows are sashes.  The house is recorded in the National Heritage List for England as a designated Grade II* listed building.

See also

Grade I and II* listed buildings in Halton (borough)
Listed buildings in Runcorn (rural area)

References

Further reading

Grade II* listed buildings in Cheshire
Country houses in Cheshire
Grade II* listed houses